Løvhaugsåa is a river in Grue Municipality in Innlandet county, Norway. The river begins at the Nydammen (new dam), the southwest outlet of the large lake Rotbergsjøen and then it flows south to the larger lake Røgden.

See also
List of rivers in Norway

References

Grue, Norway
Rivers of Innlandet